The Supper at Emmaus is the title shared by several similar works by Titian, two of which are discussed here. The first, made about 1534, is currently on long-term loan to the Walker Art Gallery in Liverpool. The second, made about 1545 by Titian and his studio, is in the National Gallery of Ireland in Dublin.

First version 
Georg Gronau considers this a replica of the Pilgrims of Emmaus in the Louvre. From the sixteenth to the eighteenth century, the picture was preserved in the Ducal Palace, Venice, and belongs now to the Earl of Yarborough. It is on long-term loan to the Walker Art Gallery in Liverpool.

Second version

Provenance 

 Venice; 
 Abbate Celotti, 1836; 
 Prince Demidoff, Villa San Dorato, near Florence, 1836; 
 Purchased, Paris, Prince Demidoff sale, March 1870.

See also 

 Road to Emmaus appearance

References

Sources 

 Gronau, Georg (1904). Titian. London: Duckworth and Co; New York: Charles Scribner's Sons. pp. 168–169, 283.
 Ricketts, Charles (1910). Titian. London: Methuen & Co. Ltd. pp. 105, 106, 115, 117, 179.
 "The Supper at Emmaus". National Gallery of Ireland. Retrieved 18 October 2022.
 "The Supper at Emmaus". National Museums Liverpool. Retrieved 18 October 2022.

Paintings by Titian
Paintings depicting the Supper at Emmaus